Monika Škáchová (born 22 November 1999) is a Slovak slalom canoeist who has competed at the international level since 2014.

Career
She won a gold medal in the C1 team event at the 2021 European Championships in Ivrea.

Škáchová was selected for the Slovak team for the C1 event at the delayed 2020 Summer Olympics in Tokyo where she qualified for the final and finished ninth.

She was named Canoe Slalom Athlete of the Year for 2019 by Slovak Canoeing. Prior to that, in 2018 she had shared the award with Soňa Stanovská.

She finished fourth at the World Championships in 2021 in the C1 class.

Škáchová is one of only a few female C1 paddlers who does not switch. She paddles on the right side and uses the crossbow stroke on the left side.

References

External links

1999 births
Living people
Slovak female canoeists
Olympic canoeists of Slovakia
Canoeists at the 2020 Summer Olympics